Stillwater is a city in the U.S. state of Minnesota and the county seat of Washington County. It is in the Minneapolis–Saint Paul metropolitan area, on the west bank of the St. Croix River, across from Houlton, Wisconsin. Stillwater's population was 18,225 at the 2010 census. Stillwater is often called "the birthplace of Minnesota" due to its role in the establishment of the state.

Geography
State Highways 36, 95, and 96 are three of the community's main routes.

Climate 
Each year has an average of 14 days above .

Name 
The name "Stillwater" was proposed in 1843 by John McKusick, who built its first sawmill and was later a state senator. The name derives from the calmness of the St. Croix River near the town center. It is also believed that McKusick had fond memories of Stillwater, Maine.

Long before McKusick and company arrived in the early 1840s, the Dakota and Ojibwe had known the place by other names. The Dakota called it Hoġan Wanḳe Kin, a term that encompassed not only the St. Croix River but also Lake St. Croix and a large sandbar across from present-day Afton. The name, meaning "the place where the fish lies", derived from a legend in which a man was transformed into a giant fish (a catfish or a pike, depending on the version) and then into a sandbar. In English, Hoġan Wanḳe Kin has been variously rendered as Hogan-wahnkay-kin, Hogan-wauke-kin and Hogan-wan-kee.

The Ojibwe name for the place was Giigoonzh-agomod, with the slightly different meaning of "where the fish floats". The Ojibwe origin legend is very similar, again involving a man transformed into a giant fish and found floating in the lake, with his ultimate transformation into "a piece of land crossing the lake there" (i.e., the sandbar). In English renderings, Giigo onh-zhagomod is harder to recognize, appearing as Kee-go-shagewa-minnie and Kegan-Shaw-Ga-Nut, but the phonetic similarities are apparent.

History

On July 29 and September 29, 1837, treaties were signed between the US government and the local Ojibwa and Dakota nations that allowed settlement in the St. Croix Valley. The settlement was founded on October 26, 1843, when four partners formed the Stillwater Lumber Company. Settlers were drawn by the area's then-abundant lumber and river traffic, making it one of Minnesota's oldest towns, preceding Minneapolis by several years. Stillwater was officially incorporated as a city on March 4, 1854 (the same day as St. Paul).

Stillwater is often referred to as the birthplace of Minnesota. In 1848, a territorial convention that began the process of establishing Minnesota as a state was held in Stillwater, at the corner of Myrtle and Main Streets. Minnesota officially became a territory in 1849 and a state in 1858.

As more evidence of Stillwater's importance at the time, the convention selected three leading Minnesota cities as locations for three important public institutions: Minneapolis got the University of Minnesota, Saint Paul became the capital, and Stillwater the site of the territory's first prison. The Minnesota Territorial Prison (later Minnesota State Prison) was opened in 1853. The prison held Cole, Jim, and Bob Younger, three of the Younger brothers of the James–Younger Gang

Lumbering was the predominant industry in the St. Croix River Valley in the second half of the 19th century, and for many years logs were sent down the St. Croix, collected at the St. Croix Boom Site two miles upstream of Stillwater, and processed in Stillwater's many sawmills. Steamboats were used most widely from 1860 to 1890, and a few are still used for entertainment today.

David Swain operated a shipyard and engine works in Stillwater. Excursion steamboats, such as the Verne Swain and the Capitol, appeared at the docks in the early 20th century.

Stillwater sent men of the 1st Minnesota Volunteer Infantry Company B and the 8th Minnesota Volunteer Infantry Regiment Company C to fight during the American Civil War.

On October 18, 1921, Charles Strite invented the automatic pop-up bread toaster in Stillwater. By 1926, the Toastmaster Company began to market the first household toaster using a redesigned version of Strite's. In 1923, Nelson's Ice Cream parlor was established.

In 1931, construction of the Stillwater lift bridge over the St. Croix River was completed at a final cost of $460,174, which was split equally between Minnesota and Wisconsin. The lift bridge is one of the city's most iconic and visible local monuments. It was part of Minnesota State Highway 36 until 2017, when it closed. In 2020 it became part of a five-mile trail loop running through Stillwater and Houlton, Wisconsin.

In 1996 the city of Stillwater entered into an agreement with Stillwater Township to annex land. In 2015 the Stillwater city council approved the annexing the last of the land covered by the agreement. The city's western border is now Manning Avenue (County Road 15). The northern border is now mostly, but not entirely, Minnesota Highway 96.

Demographics

Historic census data

1870
 White: 4,106
 Colored: 18
 Indian: 1
 Total: 4,125

1880
 White: 9,020
 Colored: 22
 Chinese or  Japanese: 2
 Total: 9,046

1890
 White: 11,209
 Colored: 18
 Civilized Indian: 1
 Total: 11,260

1910
 White: 10,137
 Born in U.S. to two U.S.-born parents: 2,447
 Born in U.S. to one or two foreign-born parents: 4,916
 Born outside U.S. 2,774
 African American: 56
 Chinese, Japanese, or Indian: 6
 Total: 10,199

1920
 White: 10,137
 Born in U.S. to two U.S.-born parents: 2,384
 Born in U.S. to one or two foreign-born parents: 3,683
 Born outside U.S. 1,664
 African American: 4
 Total: 7,735

1940
 White: 7,012
 Other: 1

1950
 White: 99.9%
 Other: 0.1%

1960
 White: 99.9%
 Other: 0.1%

1970
 White: 10,159
 African American: 1
 Indian: 12
 Asian: 9
 Japanese: 3
 Filipino: 6
 Other: 6

2000 census
As of the census of 2000, there were 15,143 people, 5,797 households, and 4,115 families living in the city. The racial makeup of the city was 94.0% White, 0.9% African American, 0.4% Native American, 1.1% Asian, 0.02% Pacific Islander, 0.1% from other races, and 1.6% from two or more races. Hispanic or Latino of any race were 1.9% of the population.

There were 5,797 households, out of which 36.8% had children under the age of 18 living with them, 57.2% were married couples living together, 10.8% had a female householder with no husband present, and 29.0% were non-families. 24.3% of all households were made up of individuals, and 9.0% had someone living alone who was 65 years of age or older. The average household size was 2.55 and the average family size was 3.07.

In the city, the population was spread out, with 27.7% under the age of 18, 6.3% from 18 to 24, 28.8% from 25 to 44, 25.4% from 45 to 64, and 11.8% who were 65 years of age or older. The median age was 38 years. For every 100 females, there were 92.9 males. For every 100 females age 18 and over, there were 86.7 males.

The median income for a household in the city was $57,154, and the median income for a family was $72,188. Males had a median income of $49,158 versus $33,680 for females. The per capita income for the city was $27,163. About 3.0% of families and 4.3% of the population were below the poverty line, including 5.6% of those under age 18 and 5.3% of those age 65 or over.

2010 census
As of the census of 2010, there were 18,225 people, 7,075 households, and 4,885 families living in the city. The racial makeup of the city was 95.1% White, 1.0% African American, 0.4% Native American, 1.1% Asian, 0.6% from other races, and 1.8% from two or more races. Hispanic or Latino of any race were 1.9% of the population.

There were 7,075 households, of which 35.6% had children under the age of 18 living with them, 54.3% were married couples living together, 11.0% had a female householder with no husband present, 3.8% had a male householder with no wife present, and 31.0% were non-families. 25.5% of all households were made up of individuals, and 8.7% had someone living alone who was 65 years of age or older. The average household size was 2.51 and the average family size was 3.03.

The median age in the city was 40 years. 26.5% of residents were under the age of 18; 6.7% were between the ages of 18 and 24; 25.3% were from 25 to 44; 29% were from 45 to 64; and 12.8% were 65 years of age or older. The gender makeup of the city was 48.5% male and 51.5% female.

2020 census 
As of the 2020 census, there were 19,394 people living in the city.

The racial makeup of the city was 89.9% White alone (95.4% White alone or in combination), 1.7% Black or African American, 0.3% American Indian and Alaska Native, 1.5% Asian, 0.05% Pacific Islander, 0.9% from other races, and 5.6% from two or more races. Hispanics of any race were 3.2% of the population.

Education
Stillwater has a mix of public district, public charter, and private schools at the primary and secondary levels. The city is served by the Stillwater Area Public Schools system and the nearest high school is Stillwater Area High School in Oak Park Heights, Minnesota.

Notable people
 Thomas J. Abercrombie, photographer, first journalist to reach South Pole, Born in Stillwater
 Ed Ackerson, musician (Polara, The 27 Various) and record producer (The Jayhawks, The Replacements, Motion City Soundtrack), born and attended high school in Stillwater
 Brian Arnfelt, NFL defensive end, attended high school in Stillwater
 Michele Bachmann, U.S. Representative, lived in Stillwater
 Ben Blankenship, member of Team USA Track and Field who set the world record in the distance medley
 Robert Brown, Minnesota state senator and educator, born in Stillwater
 Noah Cates, professional ice hockey player for the Philadelphia Flyers, born in Stillwater
 James B. Clark, director and Oscar-nominated film editor, born in Stillwater
 Jessie Diggins, Olympic gold medalist in cross-country skiing, attended high school in Stillwater
 Nate Dwyer, NFL linebacker, born in Stillwater
 Chris Engler, NBA player, born in Stillwater
 Sam Gorski and Niko Pueringer, creators of Corridor Digital
 Sean Graham, retired professional track athlete and current head track and cross country coach at American University
 Nicole Hause, skateboarder for REAL Skateboards and Nike SB, originally from Stillwater
 Patrick Hicks, novelist, poet, and essayist, grew up in Stillwater
 Phil Housley, Hockey Hall of Fame player and NHL coach, coached in Stillwater
 Sherri Jarvis, murder victim
 Todd Kalis, NFL guard, born in Stillwater
 Jessica Lange, actress, resided in Stillwater
 Frankie Lee, musician, born in Stillwater
 Chris Maddock, stand-up comedian
 Jonah Marais, member of boy band Why Don't We
 Denis McDonough, 11th Secretary of Veterans Affairs and White House Chief of Staff for President Obama, born in Stillwater
 Harriet McPherson, Minnesota state legislator, farmer, and educator
 Bob Nelson, NFL linebacker, born in Stillwater
 Socrates Nelson, Minnesota state senator, resided in Stillwater
 Karl G. Neumeier, Minnesota state senator and lawyer, born in Stillwater
 Glen Perkins, pitcher for Minnesota Twins, born in Stillwater
 Sam Shepard, playwright and actor, resided in Stillwater
 Zach Sobiech, musical artist who wrote the #1 hit “Clouds” after being diagnosed with osteosarcoma; inspiration for the Disney film Clouds
 Rich Sommer, actor, raised in Stillwater
 LaVyrle Spencer, a New York Times bestselling author, lived in Stillwater
 Alpheus Beede Stickney, a famous railroad builder, lived in Stillwater, born in Maine
 C. Gardner Sullivan, screenwriter and producer, born in Stillwater
 John B. Taft, farmer and Minnesota state legislator, resided in Stillwater
Butch Thompson, jazz pianist and clarinetist, went to high school in Stillwater
 Thomas Vanek, retired NHL winger for Buffalo Sabres and Minnesota Wild and others, resides in Stillwater

See also
 List of cities in Minnesota
History of Minnesota

References

External links

 Visitor's Bureau Website
 City website
 Greater Stillwater Chamber of Commerce
 

 
1837 establishments in Wisconsin Territory
Cities in Minnesota
Cities in Washington County, Minnesota
County seats in Minnesota
Logging communities in the United States